Mleščevo is a small settlement just south of Ivančna Gorica in central Slovenia. The area is part of the historical region of Lower Carniola. The Municipality of Ivančna Gorica is now included in the Central Slovenia Statistical Region.

References

External links
Mleščevo on Geopedia

Populated places in the Municipality of Ivančna Gorica